The sooty thrush (Turdus nigrescens) is a large thrush endemic to the highlands of Costa Rica and western Panama. It was formerly known as the sooty robin.

This is an abundant bird of open areas and oak forest edge normally above 2200 m altitude. It builds a heavy grass-lined cup nest in a tree 2–8 m above the ground, and the female lays two unmarked greenish-blue eggs between March and May.

The sooty thrush resembles other Turdus thrushes in general appearance and habits. It is 24–25.5 cm long, and weighs 96 g on average. The adult male is brownish-black with black wings and tail, and a black area between the orange bill and the eye. The legs and bare eye ring are orange and the iris is pale grey. The female is similar but browner and somewhat paler, and has yellow-orange bare parts. The juvenile resembles the adult female but has buff or orange streaks on the head and upperparts and dark spotting on the underparts.

Two superficially similar relatives share this species' range. The mountain thrush is uniformly brown with dark bare parts, and the clay-colored robin is much paler and yellow-billed.

The sooty thrush behaves like other thrushes such as the American robin. It forages on the ground, singly or in pairs, progressing in hops and dashes with frequent stops. It turns leaf litter seeking insects and spiders, and also eats small fruits, especially Ericaceae and  Solanum.

The breeding season song is a gurgling squeaky chuweek chuweek seechrrzit seechrrzit seechrrzit seechrrzit tseeur tseeur tseeur tseeur, and the call is a grating grrrrkk.

References

 Clement and Hathaway, Thrushes 
 Stiles and Skutch,  A guide to the birds of Costa Rica 

sooty thrush
sooty thrush
Birds of the Talamancan montane forests
sooty thrush